James Richard Ham (July 11, 1921 – December 20, 2002) was a Roman Catholic Titular Bishop of Putia in Numidia and Auxiliary Bishop of Saint Paul and Minneapolis in Minnesota.

Born in Chicago, Illinois, Ham was ordered a priest for the Maryknoll order on June 12, 1948. On November 28, 1967, he was appointed auxiliary bishop and served as a missionary in Guatemala from 1968 until 1979. From October 7, 1980, until his retirement on October 30, 1990, Bishop Ham served as auxiliary bishop of the Saint Paul and Minneapolis Archdiocese.

Notes

Clergy from Chicago
Maryknoll bishops
20th-century Roman Catholic bishops in the United States
1921 births
2002 deaths
Roman Catholic Archdiocese of Saint Paul and Minneapolis
Religious leaders from Minnesota
Catholics from Illinois
20th-century Roman Catholic bishops in Guatemala
Roman Catholic bishops of Santiago de Guatemala